Rogiera is a genus of flowering plants in the family Rubiaceae. It has 15 species and its native range is from Mexico to Colombia.

Rogiera amoena, Rogiera cordata, and Rogiera gratissima are sometimes cultivated as ornamentals.The type species for the genus is Rogiera amoena.

Rogiera was named and published by Jules Émile Planchon in Flore des Serres et des Jardins de l'Europe (Fl. Serres Jard. Eur.) Vol.5 on page 442 in 1849. The name honours the Belgian politician Charles Latour Rogier (1800–1885), who was also Minister for the Interior and patron of horticulture.

Some authors have included Rogiera in a broadly defined Rondeletia, but molecular phylogenetic studies have shown that Rogiera is closer to Guettarda than to Rondeletia.

Species
The following species list may be incomplete or contain synonyms;

 Rogiera amoena Planch.
 Rogiera backhouses(Hook.f.) Borhidi
 Rogiera breedlovei (Lorence) Borhidi
 Rogiera cordata (Benth.) Planch.
 Rogiera edwardsii (Standl.) Borhidi
 Rogiera gratissima Linden
 Rogiera ligustroides (Hemsl.) Borhidi
 Rogiera macdougallii (Lorence) Borhidi
 Rogiera nicaraguensis (Oerst.) Borhidi
 Rogiera oaxacensis Borhidi & K.Velasco
 Rogiera standleyana (Ant.Molina) Lorence
 Rogiera stenosiphon (Hemsl.) Borhidi
 Rogiera tabascensis Borhidi

References

External links

Rubiaceae genera
Guettardeae
Plants described in 1849